Sovramonte is a comune (municipality) in the province of Belluno in the Italian region of Veneto, located about  northwest of Venice and about  west of Belluno.

The municipality of Sovramonte contains the frazioni (subdivisions, mainly villages and hamlets) Sorriva, Zorzoi, Servo, Faller, Aune, Salzen, Croce d’Aune, Moline, and Gorna.

Sovramonte borders the following municipalities: Canal San Bovo, Feltre, Fonzaso, Imer, Lamon, Mezzano, Pedavena.

Demographic evolution

References 

Cities and towns in Veneto